The Erode Turmeric or Erodu Manjal is a type of turmeric, a spice category which is grown in the Erode region of Tamil Nadu, India.

Curcumin content
Erode Turmeric is known for the high Curcumin content which is a natural food coloring agent as approved by WHO. Erode Turmeric has about 90 percentage of Curcumin content for which it is most sought after. It is also known for its high medicinal value.

Varieties
Among the two major varieties of turmeric, the Chinna Nadan (Local Small variety) and Perum Nadan (Local Big variety), Erode grows majority of Chinna Nadan. And it is prominently grown in and around Erode in the places like Sivagiri, Kodumudi, Bhavani, Gobichettipalayam, Anthiyur, Sathyamangalam, Chennampatti and Thalavady. Also, Erode region produces both Finger variety (Virali Manjal) and Tuber variety (Kilangu manjal) of Turmerics.

Production and Marketing
Being one of the largest producer of Turmeric, Erode is also the largest market for turmeric. Originally, the area of turmeric cultivation was around one lakh acres when the entire Tamil Nadu was cultivating in 2.5 lakh acres. But now the area of turmeric cultivation has shrunk to 50,000 acres in the state while it is 15,000 acres in Erode alone. And around 18,000 tonnes of turmeric has been exported from Erode in the month of January, 2021 to various countries like Bangladesh. Also, there is a huge demand for Erode Turmeric in countries like Bangladesh, Malaysia, Singapore, United Kingdom, United States of America and the Gulf Countries.

Turmeric Markets are functioning at four different places in Erode
 ETMA Turmeric Market Complex at Semmampalayam run by Erode Turmeric Merchants and Godown Owners Association and auction by Erode Regulated Market
 EMC Turmeric Market Complex at Perundurai run by Erode Regulated Market Committee
 EAPCMS Turmeric Market Complex at Karungalpalayam run by Erode Agricultural Producers Cooperative Marketing Society
 GAPCMS Turmeric Market near Clock Tower, Erode run by Gobichettipalayam Agricultural Producers Cooperative Marketing Society

Geographical Indication
The Erode Turmeric Merchants Association applied for Geographical Indication recognition of Erode Turmeric through Government of Tamil Nadu. After an eight year process, the Government of India recognized it as a Geographical indication officially since the year 2019.

See also
 ETMA Turmeric Market Complex
 Bhavani Jamakkalam

References

Erode district
Geographical indications in Tamil Nadu
Agriculture in Tamil Nadu